Travis High School can refer to:
William B. Travis High School (Austin, Texas)
William B. Travis High School (Fort Bend County, Texas)